Single Cell Orchestra is the performing name of Miguel Fierro (born Miguel Angelo Fierro), a San Francisco-born musician who has worked for many years in electronic music and techno. His first successful single was "Transmit Liberation", an underground hit that proved influential in the development of trip hop. His first full-length was Dead Vent 7 (1995), followed by Single Cell Orchestra (1996). Later that year, he collaborated with Daum Bentley (of Freaky Chakra) to produce an album entitled Freaky Chakra vs Single Cell Orchestra.

References

External links
 https://web.archive.org/web/20070408091519/http://cyberset.cc/home.php
 myspace page
 On discogs

American electronic musicians
Living people
Year of birth missing (living people)